This is a list of films produced by the Ollywood film industry based in Bhubaneshwar and Cuttack in 1980:

A-Z

References

1980
Ollywood
Films, Ollywood
1980s in Orissa